The feminine given name Sandra may refer to:

Academics
 Sandra Beckerman, Dutch archaeologist
 Sandra Bem, American psychologist
 Sandra Dawson (academic), British social scientist and academic
 Sandra M. Faber, American astronomer
 Sandra Gilbert, American academic
 Sandra Harding, American philosopher
 Sandra Mackey, American expert on Middle Eastern culture and politics
 Sandra Lee McKay, American sociolinguist
 Sandra Myres, American historian
 Sandra Scarr, American psychology professor
 Sandra Steingraber, American biologist
 Sandra Stinnett, American statistician

Activists

 Sandra Brown, Scottish campaigner and leading expert on child protection issues
 Sandra Dodd, American unschooling advocate
 Sandra Feldman, American civil rights activist, educator and labor leader
 Sandra Froman, American president of the National Rifle Association
 Sandra Postel, American environmentalist
 Sandra Schnur, American disability rights activist
 Sandra Stotsky, American education reformist

Actresses
 Sandra Bernhard, American actress
 Sandra Blázquez (born 1987), Spanish actress
 Sandra Bullock (born 1964), American actress
 Sandra Will Carradine, American actress
 Sandra Dee, American film actress
 Sandra Dickinson, American actress
 Sandra Echeverría, Mexican actress and singer
 Sandra Ferguson, also Sandra Reinhardt, American actress
 Sandra Gough, British actress
 Sandra Gould, American actress
 Sandra Hess, Swiss actress
 Sandra Hüller, German actress
 Sandra Kerns, American actress
 Sandra McCoy, American actress
 Sandra Milo, Italian actress
 Sandra Moser (born 1969), Swiss actress
 Sandra Nelson, American actress
 Sandra Ng, Hong Kong actress
 Sandra O'Ryan, Chilean actress
 Sandra Oh, Canadian actress of Korean descent
 Sandra Prinsloo, South African actress
 Sandra Prosper, American actress
 Sandra Shamas, Canadian actress
 Sandra Shaw, American actress
 Sandra Spencer, British actress
 Sandra Zober, American actress

Fictional
 Sandra, a fictional character played by Marion Cotillard in the 2014 Belgian film Two Days, One Night
 Sandra, a fictional character voiced by Erin Yvette from video game The Walking Dead
 Sandra Briggs, a fictional character from British soap opera Emmerdale
 Sandra Clark, a fictional character played by Jackée Harry on the television series 227
 Sandra Corleone, a fictional character from The Godfather series
 Sandra "Sandy" Dombrowski, a main character in the 1971 musical Grease
 Sandra "Sandy" Swift, daughter and brother of fictional genius inventors Tom Swift Sr. and Tom Swift Jr., respectively

Artists
 Sandra Bell-Lundy, Canadian comic strip artist
 Sandra Blow, English painter
 Sandra Bowden, American painter
 Sandra Choi, British designer
 Sandra Cretu, German popular singer/songwriter 
 Sandra Fabara, Lady Pink, American graffiti artist
 Sandra Magsamen (born 1959), American author, artist, art therapist, and designer
 Sandra Mansour, Lebanese fashion designer
 Sandra Rauch, German artist

Cinema, radio and television
 Sandra Gugliotta, Argentine film director
 Sandra Lee, American author and television chef
 Sandra Tsing Loh, American radio personality
 Sandra Masone, American TV producer
 Sandra Nashaat, Egyptian director
 Sandra Studer, Swiss television personality
 Sandra Weintraub, American television writer

Journalists
 Sandra Bookman, American television news reporter and anchor
 Sandra Golpe, Spanish journalist
 Sandra Gwyn, Canadian journalist
 Sandra Maischberger, German journalist
 Sandra Sully, Australian journalist

Judges
 Sandra Beckwith, American judge
 Sandra Segal Ikuta, American judge
 Sandra Lea Lynch, American judge
 Sandra Day O'Connor, American justice of the Supreme Court of the United States
 Sandra Roper, American civil rights lawyer and judge

Models
 Sandra Angelia, Indonesian model
 Sandra Lynne Becker, American model
 Sandra Edwards, American model
 Sandra Force, American model
 Sandra Howard, English model
 Sandra Hubby, American model
 Sandra Nyanchoka, Kenyan model
 Sandra Settani, American model

Musicians
 Sandra Barber, American singer
 Sandra Chambers, Italian singer
 Sandra Chapin, American songwriter
 Sandra Collins, American DJ
 Sandra Cretu, Sandra, German singer/songwriter
 Sandra Crouch, American singer
 Sandra Denton, American singer
 Sandra Dianne, Malaysian singer-songwriter
 Sandra Gillette, American musician
 Sandra Kerr, English singer
 Sandra Kim, Belgian singer
 Sandra Lyng Haugen, Norwegian singer
 Sandra Ann Lauer, the birth name of the German singer Sandra 
 Sandra McCracken, American singer
 Sandra Mihanovich, Argentine singer
 Sandra Nasić, German singer
 Sandra Nurmsalu, Estonian singer and violinist
 Sandra Oxenryd, Swedish singer
 Sandra "Lois" Reeves, American singer
 Sandra Schleret, Austrian singer
 Sandra Sully, American musician
 Sandra Tilley, American musician
 Sandra Wright Shen, American pianist
 Sandra Zaiter, Puerto Rican singer

Politicians
 Sandra Beckerman, Dutch politician
 Sandra Botha, South African Politician
 Sandra Bussin, Canadian politician
 Sandra Bolden Cunningham, American First Lady of Jersey City
 Sandra Andersen Eira (born 1986), Norwegian Sami politician
 Sandra Frankel, American politician
 Sandra Gidley, British politician
 Sandra Goudie, New Zealand politician 
 Sandra Kalniete, Latvian politician 
 Sandra Kanck, Australian politician
 Sandra Lee-Vercoe, New Zealand politician
 Sandra Lewandowska, Polish politician
 Sandra Lovelace Nicholas, Canadian politician
 Sandra Mason, Barbadian politician and Governor-General of Barbados
 Sandra Nori, Australian politician
 Sandra Osborne, Scottish politician
 Sandra Pierantozzi, Palauan politician
 Sandra M. Pihos, American politician
 Sandra Pupatello, Canadian politician
 Sandra E. Roelofs, Dutch first lady of Georgia
 Sandra L. Smith, Canadian politician
 Sandra Márjá West, Norwegian Sami politician and festival manager of Riddu Riđđu
 Sandra White, Scottish politician
 Sandra Zampa, Italian politician

Sports
 Sandra Allen, Australian softball player
 Sandra Andersson, Swedish footballer
 Sandra Azón, Spanish sailor
 Sandra Beavis, Australian swimmer
 Sandra Bezic, Canadian figure skater 
 Sandra Cam, Belgian freestyle swimmer
 Sandra Chick, Zimbabwean field hockey player
 Sandra Dawson (cricketer) (born 1962), Irish cricketer
 Sandra Dawson (runner) (born 1970), Australian runner
 Sandra Dombrowski, Swiss ice hockey player and referee
 Sandra Douglas, British athlete
 Sandra Farmer-Patrick, American athlete
 Sandra Gasser, Swiss athlete
 Sandra Glover, American athlete
 Sandra Góngora (born 1985), Mexican ten-pin bowler
 Sandra Greaves, Canadian judoka
 Sandra Haynie, American golfer
 Sandra Izbaşa, Romanian gymnast
 Sandra Jenkins, Canadian curler
 Sandra Keith, Canadian athlete
 Sandra Kiriasis, German bobsledder
 Sandra Kloesel, German tennis player
 Sandra Le Poole, Dutch field hockey player
 Sandra Levy, Canadian field hockey player
 Sandra Lizé, Canadian water polo player 
 Sandra Mackie, New Zealand field hockey player
 Sandra Moya, Puerto Rican track and field athlete
 Sandra Myers, Spanish sprinter
 Sandra Neilson, American swimmer
Sandra Owusu-Ansah, Ghanaian footballer
 Sandra Palmer (golfer), American golfer
 Sandra Perković, Croatian athlete
 Sandra Post, Canadian golfer
 Sandra Reynolds Price, South African tennis player
 Sandra Ruales, Ecuadorian athlete 
 Sandra Rucker, American figure skater
 Sandra Schmirler, Canadian curler
 Sandra Schumacher, German cyclist 
 Sandra Seuser, German sprinter
 Sandra Soldan, Brazilian athlete
 Sandra Stals, Belgian runner
 Sandra Völker, German swimmer
 Sandra Wagner-Sachse, German athlete

Writers
 Sandra Alland, Canadian poet
 Sandra Birdsell, Canadian writer
 Sandra Boynton, American writer
 Sandra Brown, American writer
 Sandra M. Castillo, American poet
 Sandra Cisneros, American author and poet
 Sandra Dempsey, Canadian playwright
 Sandra Djwa (born 1939), Canadian writer
 Sandra Jackson-Opoku, American writer
 Sandra Kitt, American writer
 Sandra McDonald, American author
 Sandra Miesel, American writer
 Sandra Sabatini, Canadian writer
 Sandra Scoppettone, American author
 Sandra Worth, Canadian author

Multiple people 

 Sandra Smith
 Sandra Williams

Other people
 Sandra Cantu (2001–2009), American murder victim
 Sandra Ciesek (born 1978), German physician and virologist
 Sandra Diaz-Twine (born 1974), American television personality
 Sandra Good (born 1944), American member of Manson Family
 Sandra Keller (born 1967), Sultaana Freeman, American Muslim
 Sandra Lerner (born 1955), American businesswoman
 Sandra Magnus (born 1964), American astronaut
 Sandra Rozzo, American murder victim
 Sandra Scheuer, murdered American student
 Sandra Tanner (born 1941), American critic of The Church of Jesus Christ of Latter-day Saints

See also
 Sander (name)
 Sandrine
 Sandro
 Sondra
 Sandy (given name)

References

Sandra